Jagua tattoo is a temporary form of skin decoration resulting from the application of an extract of the fruit  Genipa americana, also known as jagua.  This fruit has been used for body ornamentation and medicinal purposes in many areas of South America for centuries. It has recently been introduced in North America and Europe as an addition to henna body art, also called mehendi, mehandi, or mehndi in India. (The term "henna tattoo" is often used as a generic term for temporary tattoos.)

The jagua tattoo method involves the surface application of a dye which then sets within a few hours, staining the upper layer of skin, or epidermis. The body sloughs off this layer of skin continuously and eventually, the tattoo fades and disappears.

The term "tattoo" is more commonly associated with the permanent surgical insertion of pigment underneath the skin, as opposed to pigments applied to the skin's surface. Both mehndi (henna) and jagua tattoos stain the top skin layer. In the case of jagua the color develops and darkens over several days until blue-black.

While henna tattoos are associated with Indian, African, and Middle Eastern cultures, jagua body art was invented by circum-Caribbean tribes and indigenous peoples of the Amazon region.

The fruit
Genipa americana is a species of Genipa, native to northern South America (south to Peru), the Caribbean and southern Mexico, growing in profusion in rainforests. It is commonly called huito; the alternate name jagua  may refer to other species of Genipa as well. To the Inca, it was known as hawa or wituq. In the British islands of the West Indies, it was called the marmalade box.

It is a medium size tree growing to 15 m tall. The leaves are opposite, lanceolate to oblong, 20–35 cm long, and 10–19 cm broad, glossy dark green, with an entire margin. The flowers are white, yellow, or red, with a five-lobed corolla 5–6 cm diameter. The fruit is a thick-skinned edible berry 5–8 cm diameter.

Indigenous uses
Native tribes in the Amazon traditionally use the juice of the jagua fruit for body ornamentation.  Certain tribes, such as the Matses Indians of Peru also insert it underneath the skin to create permanent markings on the body.  Additionally, the fruit is used for a host of purported medicinal purposes.  Peoples known to use the jagua fruit (currently or in the past) include: The Zapara, Shuar, Tsachila, Emberá-Wounaan, Yucuna, Kuna, Yuqui, Tikuna, Yagua, Arakmbut, Ka'apor, Canelos-Quichua, Amazonian Kichwas and Shipibo-Conibo.

Western uses
"Jagua tattoo" is a term used by people in the body art industry to refer to a form of temporary tattoo, which is created using the juice or extract of the Genipa americana or jagua fruit. Designs created with jagua appear blue/black in color on the skin and resemble a real tattoo (henna tattoos are reddish-brown in color). Depending on a variety of factors, the stain on the skin lasts one to two weeks, fading gradually as the skin exfoliates.  Some henna artists use the jagua tattoo preparations as an additional temporary tattoo option, and some professional tattoo artists use it to give their customers the option of 'trying out' a tattoo before using permanent ink.

Several companies selling temporary tattoo kits have introduced products made with jagua as a base.

See also
 Body painting

References

Body art
Indigenous peoples of Panama topics
Indigenous culture of the Amazon